The Hogbetsotso festival (pronounced Hogbechocho)  is celebrated by the chiefs and people of Anlo in the Volta region of Ghana.
Some major Anlo towns include Anloga (capital), Keta, Kedzi, Vodza, Whuti, Srogboe, Tegbi, Dzita, Abor, Afiadenyigba, Anyako, Konu, Alakple, Atsito , Atiavi, Deʋegodo, Atorkor, Tsiame and many other villages.
The festival is celebrated annually on the first Saturday in the month of November at Anloga which is the customary and ritual capital of the Anlo state.  The name of the festival is derived from the Ewe language and translates as, the festival of exodus. or "coming from Hogbe (Notsie)". The celebration of the festival was instituted about four decades ago.

History
The Anlo is a group of people from a tribe on the eastern coast of Ghana. Prior to their settling in their present location, they lived in Notsie, a town in present-day Togo.  It is believed that they had migrated from southern Sudan through Oyo area in Nigeria, Ketou in Benin , Adja Tado in Togo to settle in Notsie. Oral tradition has it that they lived under a wicked king, Togbe Agorkoli ( Agor Akorli), and in order to escape his tyrannical rule they had to create a hole in the mud wall that surrounded their town. They achieved this by instructing the women to pour all their wastewater on one particular place in the wall. Over time the spot became soft, thereby allowing the townspeople to break through the wall and escape. Tradition also holds that, to avoid pursuit and make good their escape, they walked backward with their faces towards the town so that their footprints appeared to be going into the town.

The celebration
Various ceremonies are held during the festival. They include a peace-making period in which all disputes are ended with the finding of an amicable solution. It is believed that the reason for this traditional period of peacemaking is that the people believe their ancestors lived in harmony with themselves all through their escape from Notsie and that it was this character that made their sojourn a success. There is also a purification ceremony of the ceremonial stools (where the Ewe believe the ancestral spirits reside) through the pouring of libations. This is followed by general cleaning where all the villages are swept and rubbish burnt. This cleaning ceremony starts at the Volta River and ends after several days at the Mono River in the Republic of Togo. The climax of the festival involves a durbar of the chiefs and people of Anlo. The chiefs dress in colourful regalia/ kente and receive homage from their subjects at the durbar grounds.  Various forms of dancing, singing and merry-making characterize the entire festival.

The Agbadza
The Agbadza originally a war dance in imitation of birds in flight and formerly known as atrikpui, is the traditional dance of the people of Anlo which is performed vigorously during the grand durbar of the Hogbetsotso festival. It is a way of expressing joy to their ancestors and gods. Agbadza can be performed anywhere, at parties, funerals and at naming ceremonies. In this modern age, anyone from any tribe can perform the Agbadza dance regardless. Another example of Ewe dances is the borborbor dance.

Today 
The 2019 Hogbetsotso festival was attended by some dignitaries including two Ghanaian Ex-Presidents, Jerry John Rawlings, and John Dramani Mahama. The 2019 festival was with the theme, "Uniting Anlo through its value for the benefits of its citizens and the nation at large".

References

 13  Felix Kuadugah - contributor, Ewe migration. History of Agbadza. 

Festivals in Ghana
Volta Region